A sebaceous filament is a tiny collection of sebum and dead skin cells around a hair follicle, which usually takes the form of a small, yellow to off-white hair-like strand when expressed from the skin.

These filaments are naturally occurring, and are especially prominent on the nose. They are typical among those with naturally oily skin and large pores, even if those individuals have ceased to produce acne. They are not a sign of infection or any other ailment including acne, and are commonly mistaken for, though cannot form blackheads. Expression, or squeezing, is discouraged as sebaceous filaments are a natural part of healthy human skin. As such, squeezing can lead to unintentional unnecessary harm, such as scarring or inflammation. They help to channel the flow of sebum within a given pore, allowing it to seep gradually to the surface. David A. Whiting described them in his review in the Western Journal of Medicine as "a loose, porous mass of horny detritus".

References

Dermatologic terminology